Tallinn Ballet School is ballet school in Tallinn, Estonia. It is the only educational institution for professional ballet dancers in Estonia. The head teacher of school is Kaie Kõrb.

The school was established in 1946.

As of 2020, there are studying about 100 dancers.

Studying period lasts 8 years.

References

External links

Schools in Tallinn
Ballet schools
Ballet in Estonia